Naked Africa is a 1957 American documentary film about Africa released under the pretense of being an educational ethnographic film. It was released on a double bill with White Huntress. The film was later re-rereleased under the title Mondo Africana to exploit the shockumentaries Mondo Cane and Africa Addio.

See also
 List of American films of 1957
 Nudity in film

References

External links

1957 films
American International Pictures films
1950s English-language films